Burragorang or Burragorang Valley is a locality in the Macarthur Region of New South Wales, Australia, in Wollondilly Shire. It is home to Lake Burragorang, which is impounded by Warragamba Dam. It is located within the Blue Mountains National Park – specifically the Nattai National Park.

History

In 1827, the town of Burragorang was established as a mining town and up to the 1960s was a major supplier of coal. Moreover, lead and silver had also been mined in the valley until about 1927.

With the boom of Sydney's population after World War II, Warragamba Dam was constructed between 1948 and 1960 on the Warragamba River, inundating the Burragorang Valley, creating Lake Burragorang. Consequently, the town of Burragorang and others like it in the valley were lost under water.

The area around Burragorang and Nattai had been home to numerous collieries from the 1920s to the 1990s, such as the Nattai-Bulli, Oakleigh, Wollondlly, Nattai North and Valley collieries. It is estimated 72 million tonnes of coal was mined in the Burragorang-Nattai region. The area also had deposits of oil shale, and some mining of shale occurred.

The ABC programme A Drowned Valley by ABC Open producer Sean O'Brien documents former residents' memories of living in the valley before its inundation.

Attractions

The Burragorang Valley has some scenic lookouts over the valley and lake.

Etymology
Burragorang is said to derive from the words burro (meaning kangaroo) or booroon (small animal) and the word gang (meaning to hunt). Therefore, Burragorang is believed to mean place to hunt kangaroo or place to hunt small animals.

References

External link

Localities in New South Wales
Wollondilly Shire
Resumed localities in Australia